is a town located in Sōraku District, Kyoto Prefecture, Japan.  the town has a population of 36,198.

Seika, although largely agriculturally based, has in recent years become the center of a national project, the Kansai Science City, and has been referred to as the "New Culture Capital" of Japan. Nippon Telegraph and Telephone Corporation (NTT), Matsushita Electric, Kyocera and many other companies have facilities in the town.

History
Archaeological records indicate that people have inhabited modern-day Seika since at least the Yayoi period. Seika is home to Inayazuma Castle, where part of the Yamashiro Riots of 1485 took place. The area around Seika has historically been considered a cultural corridor between the two ancient capitals of Kyoto and Nara.

The area that is now Seika was previously occupied by several agricultural villages. In 1931, the villages of Hōsono, Komada, and Inada merged to form the village of Kawanishi, which in turn merged with the village of Yamadashō in 1951 to form the village of Seika. In 1955, the village of Seika was incorporated as the town of Seika.

Beginning in the 1960s, Seika has experienced rapid growth as commuters to Kyoto, Osaka and Nara move into the town. The town's population tripled in the span of 35 years, growing from 10,929 people in 1970 to 34,236 people in 2005. According to the 2005 census, Seika is the fastest-growing municipality in Japan.

Geography
Seika is located at the southern tip of Kyoto Prefecture, bordered by the Kizu River to the east and the Keihanna Hills to the west. Due to its position adjacent to the Kizu River, the eastern part of Seika has rich, fertile land ideal for agricultural production. The hilly western and southern parts of Seika, by contrast, are largely residential.

Nature
Seika's largest peak is Dakeyama (嶽山), at 259.5 meters.  It is located on the west side of Seika near the border of Kyotanabe city.

Neighborhoods
Inuidani (乾谷)
Ueda (植田)
Kita-inayazuma (北稲八妻)
Sakuragaoka (桜が丘)
Zakuro (柘榴)
Shimokoma (下狛)
Sugai (菅井)
Seikadai (精華台)
Hikaridai (光台)
Higashibata (東畑)
Hishida (菱田)
Housono (祝園)
Housono-nishi (祝園西)
Minami-inayazuma (南稲八妻)
Yamada (山田)

Demographics
Per Japanese census data, the population of Seika has increased in recent decades.

Sightseeing and events
Seika is home to Keihanna Plaza, a large building in the Kansai Science City boasting an auditorium and other facilities, as well as a large sundial known for projecting lasers into the sky at night. Keihanna Commemorative Park, which includes a large botanical garden, can also be found in the town. Additionally, the Kansai branch of the Diet Library is located in Seika.

Seika is home to several large festivals held annually. The Strawberry Hunt Festival is famous and has many visitors. Another well-known event is the Igomori Festival, which dates back to 770 A.D. and features a large, blazing torch being carried through the darkness of the night. Seika's main event is the Seika Festival, a large fair held every November featuring a large variety of different booths and performances, among other attractions.

Several notable temples and shrines are located in Seika. These include Hosono Shrine, where the Igomori Festival takes place, and Raikoji Temple, where the protagonists of Chikamatsu Monzaemon's play Love Suicides on the Eve of the Koshin Festival are buried.

Economy

Agriculture
While strawberries are Seika's most famous product, the town is also known for its shrimp taro and green chili peppers.

Industry
The presence of the Kansai Science City makes research and technology core components of Seika's economy. Currently the following companies have facilities in Seika:
Advanced Telecommunications Research Institute International
NTT West
Panasonic
NICT National Institute of Information and Communications Technology
Kyocera
Shimadzu Corp.
Nidec

Locally Based Companies
In addition to the companies with facilities in Seika, companies headquartered in Seika include:
Activelink
Takako
Silex.

Government
The current mayor of Seika is Kaname Kimura. Seika has a town council composed of 21 members.

Transportation

Rail
Seika is served by two rail companies, JR West and Kintetsu. The JR Gakkentoshi Line connects Seika to Osaka, while Kintetsu Kyoto Line provides service to Kyoto and, via connection to the Nara Line at Yamato-Saidaiji Station, to Nara and Osaka. The JR Rapid train and Kintetsu Express train stop at Seika's Hōsono Station and Shin-Hōsono Station, respectively. JR Shimokoma Station as well as the Kintetsu Komada and Yamadagawa stations are also located in Seika.

Bus
Seika is served by the Seika Kururin Bus and Nara Kōtsū Bus.

Roads
Seika is connected by the Zakuro and Yamadagawa Bypasses to National Route 163, which runs between Osaka and Mie Prefecture. The Keinawa Expressway also connects to Seika via the Seika-Shimokoma, Seika-Gakken, and Yamadagawa Interchanges.

Education

Postsecondary
 Kyoto Prefectural University, Seika Campus

Private and charter schools
 Kyoto Kōgakkan High School

Public schools
 Seikadai Elementary School
 Higashihikari Elementary School
 Yamadasho Elementary school
 Kawanishi Elementary School
 Seihoku Elementary School
 Seika Junior High School
 Seika Nishi Junior High School
 Seika Minami Junior High School
 Minamiyamashiro Special Education High School

International relations

Twin towns – Sister cities
Seika is twinned with:
 Norman, United States, since 2005

Neighboring municipalities
 Kyoto Prefecture
 Kyōtanabe
 Kizugawa
 Nara Prefecture
 Ikoma
 Nara

Notable people
 Misato Watanabe
 Tsuyoshi Nishioka

References

External links

 
 Official website 
 Official Kyoto Across Cultures Blog 

Towns in Kyoto Prefecture
Kansai Science City